Southern Avenue is an island platformed Washington Metro station in Hillcrest Heights, Maryland, United States. The station was opened on January 13, 2001, and is operated by the Washington Metropolitan Area Transit Authority (WMATA). Providing service for only the Green Line, the station is located on the southern side of Southern Avenue, putting it just outside the District of Columbia, opposite Valley Terrace. Southern Avenue is the first station in Maryland going southeast on the Green Line.

Groundbreaking for the final segment of the Green Line occurred on September 23, 1995, and the station opened on January 13, 2001.

This station provides service to the National Harbor via Metrobus route NH1 and TheBus route 35.

Station layout
Although this station is open-cut, and the next station east (railroad south) (Naylor Road) is elevated, there is an underground section of the Green Line's tracks between these two stations; additionally, the Southern Avenue station descends into a tunnel at its western (railroad northern) end.

References

External links

 The Schumin Web Transit Center: Southern Ave Station
 Station from Google Maps Street View

Stations on the Green Line (Washington Metro)
Washington Metro stations in Maryland
Railway stations in the United States opened in 2001
2001 establishments in Maryland